Al-Hāshimiyah is one of the districts  of Zarqa governorate, Jordan.

References 

 
Districts of Jordan